Hamateur Night is a 1939 Warner Bros. Merrie Melodies cartoon directed by Tex Avery and written by Jack Miller. The short was released on January 28, 1939 and features an early version of Elmer Fudd.

History

The premise of the film is rather simple; it features a vaudeville-style amateur talent night (see, for example, the contemporary and still-ongoing "Amateur Night" competitions at the Apollo Theater and the long-running radio-turned-television show Amateur Hour) with a format that resembles the much later television program The Gong Show in that it features a judge who strikes a gong to stop the performance of any entertainer whom he deems bad. The primary character of this short is a prototype of Elmer Fudd who lacks the speech impediment of the character he evolved into.

The cartoon entered the public domain in 1968 when its last rightsholder, United Artists Television (successor-in-interest to Associated Artists Productions), failed to renew the original copyright within the required 28-year period.

Plot
At a local theater, a list of attractions is being shown. The main attraction is Four Daughters, with selected shorts. An orchestra starts to play as the show begins, and the dog hosting the show pops out. He is going to tell the audience what they can be expecting, but is interrupted by the Prototype-Elmer Fudd singing, "She'll be coming 'round the mountain when she comes". Prototype-Elmer is yanked from the stage by a hook, and the host continues, but Elmer returns singing the same song. This time he is yanked back again by two hooks.

The next act is named, "Maestro Padawisky", a so-called talented piano player, but actually he puts a nickel into a coin slot and the piano plays for him. This doesn't impress the judge and he's sent down and out through a trap door in the stage, with the piano crashing on him off-screen.

A dog in the audience hopes to relax as he inserts his feet between the cushion and bottom edge of the seat in front of him, but he's interrupted by a hippopotamus that sits down in that same seat, crushing the dog's feet. The dog walks off, weeping in sorrow for his now-bent feet.

The next act is a bird that can sing himself up to the sky, so much that he nearly reaches the top of the theater before he is distracted when the judge rings the bell, sending him falling through the trap door into the basement.

In the audience a dog is interrupted by the hippopotamus's raucous laughter, and he eventually walks off, after the hippopotamus accidentally pounds his head into his body.

The host announces the next act, "The Hindu Mystic, Swami River". An Arabian-looking guy comes out and asks for a subject from the audience. He spots Elmer and thinks he sees a perfect stool pigeon. Elmer goes onto the stage, and is told to go inside a basket, where the man sticks a sword right through it, in a basic replication of the Indian Basket Trick. He asks Elmer to get up, but gets no response, and opens it to find a not-so-positive response. He asks an usher to deliver the man's money back, thus ending his act.

The next act is dubbed "the world's smallest entertainer", Teeny, Tiny, Tinsy, Tinny-Tinny-Tin. A girl flea then hops on the stage and recites "Mary Had a Little Lamb" in a very high-pitched squeaky voice and laughs when she finishes the poem, but is rejected.

The next act is called, "Fleabag MacBoodle and his trained dog act". The owner, a walrus, asks his Jack Russell terrier to roll over, play dead, sit up, and speak. The dog actually does speak, but he is rejected and sent down to the basement.

Back in the audience, the same hippopotamus that caused the two previous people to leave, underestimates his strength and his laughter and ends up knocking five people beside him through a wall right out of the theater.

Other acts that play include a fox reciting Shakespeare, which ends with the fox getting tomatoes thrown in his face, and then rejected, and the balcony scene from Romeo and Juliet done by a rooster (Romeo) and a hen (Juliet), but it's interrupted by the hippopotamus's laughter, and so Romeo decides to shut the hippopotamus up. The balcony scene continues until Romeo discovers that Juliet has the same annoying laugh as the hippopotamus. The curtain closes up and Romeo shuts Juliet up behind the curtain.

As the host is going to announce who won the cup, he is interrupted by Elmer once again. He is yanked back again, this time by three hooks, plus a fourth hook that snares his hat when it gets left behind. The announcer is surprised to learn that the audience loves Elmer, until he sees that everyone in the crowd looks exactly like Elmer as they applaud raucously.

Home media

VHS - The Golden Age of Looney Tunes Vol. 3: Tex Avery (unrestored)
Laserdisc - The Golden Age of Looney Tunes Vol. 1, Side 3 (unrestored)
Streaming - HBO Max (Restored) (removed)

References

External links

 Hamateur Night on the Internet Archive

1939 animated films
1939 films
Merrie Melodies short films
Warner Bros. Cartoons animated short films
Films directed by Tex Avery
Elmer Fudd films
Hollywood, Los Angeles in fiction
1930s Warner Bros. animated short films